Circus Live is a 3-disc live album by John Cale released on February 19, 2007.  The contents were recorded live on the 2004 and 2006 European tours.  One of the discs is a DVD containing rehearsal footage, a music video, and a two audio tracks.

One performance included, September 12, 2004, at the Paradiso in Amsterdam, was broadcast on air and online.

Track listing 
All tracks by John Cale; except where indicated

Personnel 
 John Cale − lead vocal, electric and acoustic guitars, keyboards, electric viola
 Dustin Boyer (2006 tracks) − lead guitar, toys, backing vocals
 Joseph Karnes (2006 tracks) − bass, Nord 3, samples, backing vocals
 Michael Jerome (2006 tracks) − drums, samples, backing vocals
 Mark Deffenbaugh (2004 tracks) − acoustic guitar, banjo, harmonica
 Deantoni Parks (2004 tracks) − drums, samples
 Charlie Campagne (2004 tracks) − drone samples

References 

Albums produced by John Cale
John Cale live albums
2007 live albums
EMI Records live albums